Broken Glass is an EP released by alternative pop duo Cat's Eyes in 2011
 on the Polydor record label as a download and two limited edition 7" singles in a gatefold sleeve.

The EP featured three original compositions by the band – "Cat's Eyes", "The Best Person I Know" (which would both later appear on the band's debut album, Cat's Eyes) and "Love You Anyway" – along with the track "Sunshine Girls", a song written by vocalist Faris Badwan's full-time band The Horrors that never went beyond demo stage.

Track listing

Personnel
 Faris Badwan
 Rachel Zeffira

References

2011 debut EPs
Cat's Eyes albums
Polydor Records EPs
Albums produced by Steve Osborne